Giuseppe Tonelli (1668–1732) was an Italian painter of the Baroque period, active mainly in Florence. He studied under Tommaso Aldrovandini and Jacopo Chiavistelli. He worked alongside Giuseppe Nasini during 1696–1699 in frescoing the ceiling of second floor corridor of the Uffizi gallery facing the Arno. He painted quadratura for Sebastiano Ricci in the Pitti Palace.

Sources

Uffizi gallery.

1668 births
1732 deaths
17th-century Italian painters
Italian male painters
18th-century Italian painters
Painters from Florence
Italian Baroque painters
18th-century Italian male artists